Kelayeh-ye Vosta (also Romanized as Kelāyeh-ye Vosţá) is a village in Dehdasht-e Sharqi Rural District, in the Central District of Kohgiluyeh County, Kohgiluyeh and Boyer-Ahmad Province, Iran. At the 2006 census, its population was 61, in 11 families.

References 

Populated places in Kohgiluyeh County